The Annual Warrior Competition is a combat-oriented competition that is based on physical ability, teamwork, communication and individual accuracy which takes place at the King Abdullah II Special Operations Training Centre (KASOTC) in Amman, Jordan. Jordan created the competition in May 2009.

Background
The Annual Warrior Competition aims to promote sharing of best practices, technology, and hardware; through gear and weapons display and live demonstrations by international retailers, and expose strengths and weaknesses in unit and individual skill sets.

Every year the competition is redesigned to reflect the ever-changing threats posed by terrorism. Competing “Warriors” are expected to demonstrate competencies and adaptability of marksmanship, endurance, teamwork, tactics and communications on the battlefield. They are observed and judged by a panel of reputable international experts from various professional military and law enforcement backgrounds. Over thirty international and local teams participate every year.

About the King Abdullah II Special Operations Training Centre

The King Abdullah II Special Operations Training Centre, also known as KASOTC, is located in Amman, Jordan.KASOTC offers tailored training courses or training support for clients with their own programs.

References

External links

New York Times - Sleep Away Camp for PostModern Cowboys
Small Arms Defence Journal - THE WARRIOR COMPETITION, “THE KING’S CHALLENGE” 
KASOTC Official Website

Events in Jordan
Military of Jordan
Spring (season) events in Jordan